Mrs. O'Malley and Mr. Malone is a 1950 comedy/murder mystery film set on board a train. It stars Marjorie Main and James Whitmore. It is based on the short story "Once Upon a Train (The Loco Motive)" by Stuart Palmer and Craig Rice.

Plot
Montana housewife Hattie O'Malley boards a train bound for New York because she's on her way to collect a prize she's won from a radio program. Getting on board in Chicago is criminal attorney John J. Malone, whose client, Steve Kepplar, just released from prison in Joliet, still owes him $10,000.

Suspicion exists that Kepplar himself will be on the train, heading to New York to retrieve $100,000 he previously stashed from a robbery. Chicago detective Tim Marino is a passenger. So is the ex-convict's business partner, Myron Brynk, and his moll, a looker named Lola.

Kepplar is indeed along for the ride, disguised as a sailor. Lola is in on it, hiding him in her compartment. But soon his dead body is found, followed by hers. More and more, the detective comes to believe lawyer Malone and even Hattie could be involved in this, but Brynk turns out to be the man he's after.

Story origins and pre-production
In the 1930s and '40s, MGM produced the "Thin Man" series of six films, based on Dashiell Hammett's novel. It was very popular with American audiences for all 13 years of its run.

In the late 1940s, MGM decided to try to repeat its success with the help of Craig Rice, one of the leading mystery writers of the time. She was famous for her stories featuring fast-talking lawyer John J. Malone, who often cut ethical corners while solving crimes. MGM also approached Stuart Palmer, another famous mystery writer of the era. Together, Rice and Palmer wrote a short story titled "Once Upon a Train (The Loco Motive)", teaming Malone with Palmer's most famous character, Hildegarde Withers, who had appeared previously in films in the 1930s. However, MGM replaced the character of Withers with that of "Mrs. O'Malley" due to copyright issues with the publisher of Palmer's stories.

Director Norman Taurog was chosen by MGM to direct the film adaptation, as it was a screwball comedy/mystery, a strength of his. However, instead of letting Palmer and Rice write the screenplay, he delegated the duties to William Bowers. Bowers' screenplay resembled the short story that Rice and Palmer had written, so the elements of comedy and mystery that Rice included in her works were preserved in the film adaptation.

Cast
 Marjorie Main as Harriet "Hattie" O'Malley
 James Whitmore as John J. Malone
 Ann Dvorak as Connie Kepplar
 Phyllis Kirk as Kay
 Fred Clark as Inspector Tim Marino
 Dorothy Malone as Lola Gillway
 Clinton Sundberg as Donald
 Douglas Fowley as Steve Kepplar
 Willard Waterman as Mr. Ogle
 Don Porter as Myron Brynk
 Jack Bailey as The Game Show Host
 Nancy Saunders as Joanie
 Basil Tellou as The Greek Passenger
 James Burke as The Train Conductor

Reception
According to MGM records the film earned $772,000 in the US and Canada and $143,000 overseas, leading to a loss of $31,000.

References

External links
 
 
 
 

1950 films
1950s comedy mystery films
American black-and-white films
American comedy mystery films
1950s English-language films
Films scored by Adolph Deutsch
Films based on short fiction
Films directed by Norman Taurog
Metro-Goldwyn-Mayer films
Rail transport films
Films based on works by Craig Rice
1950 comedy films
1950s American films